The Somanatha Pashana Lingeswarar Temple in Timiri, Tamil Nadu India is a Hindu temple dedicated to Lord Shiva.

Temple
The Somanatha Pashana Lingeswarar Temple is in Timiri in Vellore District, Tamil Nadu. In Timiri, there were efforts to build an Ayyappan Temple. There was not much progress even after strenuous efforts. On this note, Mr. Radhakrishnan, who was head of the committee constructing the temple, visited Thanjavur and got directions in Nadi (old palm manuscripts written by Sages) regarding the Pashana lingam hid 500 years back in temple tank in Timiri. Radhakrishna followed the instructions as per Nadi and searched for the pashana lingam concealed at the Thimiri Fort Somanatha Easwara Temple tank at a depth of 32 feet. With support from his spiritual friends and public of the Timiri, Radhakrishna was able to retrieve the Pashana Lingam on 14 June 1985. The bees wax, maalpacchai and the tortoise shaped shield had kept the pashana lingam intact even after so many years.

All the instructions on how to construct the temple, materials that should be used for the flagpole, their significance, the special benefits that the lingam would confer on visitors etc. were all found in the original palm leaf manuscripts. A new temple has been built on the banks of Thimiri Fort Somanatha Easwarya Temple Tank under the Peepal tree as per the naadi instructions. Thiru. A.S. Radhakrishna installed the pashana lingam within a  foot high glass box with the help of the general public and has been performing pooja and sacred ablutions to the pashana lingam with utmost sincerity for the past 25 years. Kumbabishekam of the temple was performed in September 2005. The beautiful temple turret (gopuram) adds to its glory. The wide Mahamandapam along with its beautiful entrance enhances the grace of the temple further.

Legend
In the history of Vijayanagara Empire, Thimmi Reddy and Bommi Reddy, who were ruling with Vellore fort as Headquarters, were noteworthy kings. Their descendant, Sadhashivaraya did many good deeds in Divakarayar Ellai, a rural location next to Arcot in those days. In his rule, there was a wide spread epidemic, due to which people suffered a lot. Being very pious and caring, the  King Sadhashivaraya discussed this with 'Raja Panditha Sironmani, Manthira Vaidhya Kesari' Kannika Parameswara Andhanar, who was the Raja vaidhyar (doctor) of his kingdom.

Vaidhyar, on Dhanvanthri methods, used 5 Chandra Pashanams, to make a lingam, called Somanatha Eeswara Pashana Lingam. Chandra pashanams are related to moon and the rays of moon will induce them to  have better medicinal effect. The lingam measured 6 inches in height.  Timiri is name of one of the Pashanams used to make this Lingam.

In the Tamil month of Thai's Arudhra star of 1379 A.D., the lingam's pradhishtai was carried out inside the Thimiri fort by Sringeri Mutt's 12th Sankarachariyar, Shri Vidhyaranya Swamigal. Since the lingam was made on both Agama and Siddha medicine rules, the Abhishega theertham served the purpose of curing diseases. Owing to the fame of lingam, the area which was known as Divakarayar Ellai, was renamed as Thimiri.

Later, when Arcot Namab invaded this area, the Vellore Fort was also captured. The Muslims plundered temples and other sacred places in this area. Kannika Parameswarar protected his rare and special pashana lingam from the invaders as follows. He smeared beeswax on the lingam, placed it inside a tortoise shaped shield made with special chemicals. The Lingam and the shield were placed within a triangular box that was created with geographic principles and hid it in the temple tank in the year 1454 A.D. The Royal medicine man rushed along with his group to the border of Kanchipuram to escape from being captured by the invaders. The Muslim soldiers, who heard about their escape from the spies, captured them and brought them to Sri Renukambhal temple at Aanaimalloor near Timiri. They were killed by letting an elephant step on them. At the time of being trampled by the elephant, Kannika Parameswarar swore on Lord Shiva that if at all he has another birth he will rescue the lingam and will reinstall it.

Speciality
Timiri Pashana lingam cannot be found anywhere else. It is not a mere lingam but one with special radiations that can travel great distances. The medicinal property of the water from sacred ablution of the pashana lingam grants the state of makaara in the heart, corrects heart's function, kidney diseases and grants several benefits in life. As the lingam is created using Timiri pashanam, it can sublime. Hence, water is trickled over it continuously to keep it cool. Those who consume this sacred water are blessed with physical and mental well-being.

The fact that all these information about the pashana lingam are found in the Thiruvaavaduturai Adheenam's work, Skandar Manimaalai Sadhagam is worth mentioning. The emergence of this lingam was predicted by not only the above-mentioned work but also by great Saints like Vittobha Swamigal, Seshadri Swamigal and Poondi Mahaan.

When those with nervous disorders, heart problems and hypertension touch the dvajasthamba of this temple and worship it, it gives them a shock treatment. The secret behind the universal electronic store chamber form of Somanatha Pashana Lingeswarar temple is that those who are suffering from mental diseases, depression and loss of memory will benefit by worshiping the dvajasthamba through the sacred touch worship ritual. Those who doubt it will realize it when they have firsthand experience of it.

Just as how the power of the Sun and the Moon does not decrease over time this pashana lingam remains with its immense power and fully completeness. When pure water, honey, milk, sacred ash, bilva leaves, rock candy and other medicinal products listed by Sage Agasthya in the nadi leaves, are offered to the pashana lingam through sacred ablution and consumed with devotion, the skin problems, mental problems, diabetes, hypertension and nervous disorders encountered these days, will be cured.

Festival
Daily worship rituals are performed both in the morning and in the evening and the theertha prasadam is distributed to the devotees. 
Special ablutions to the Pashana lingam, such as that with honey are performed on full moon days. Special full moon days are in the Tamil months of Chitirai, Kaarthigai, Thai and Panguni. Aani Thirumanjanam and special prayer rituals on Arudra nakshatra days are being performed.

The temple is open from 6:30 am to 1 pm and 4 pm to 8:30 pm.

References

Shiva temples in Vellore district